Luke James Joyce (born 9 July 1987) is an English professional footballer who plays as a midfielder for  club Radcliffe.

He came through the youth-team at Wigan Athletic to make his first-team debut in January 2006. He was allowed to sign for Carlisle United six months later, from where he was loaned out to Conference Premier clubs Barrow and Northwich Victoria during the 2008–09 season. He signed with Accrington Stanley in June 2009 and spent the next six years with the club, including over three seasons as captain, making a total of 276 league and cup appearances. He returned to Carlisle United in May 2015 and spent three years with the club, for an overall period of six years and 161 appearances in all competitions over his two spells. He moved on to Port Vale in May 2018, where he would remain a key fixture in the starting eleven for his three seasons at the club. He dropped into non-League football after signing for AFC Fylde in June 2021. He moved on to Radcliffe 12 months later.

Career

Wigan Athletic
Joyce was born in Bolton, Greater Manchester, and was at the Academy at Bolton Wanderers from the age of eight until he was released at age ten or eleven. He went on to play Sunday League football and captained the Wigan schools' team. He joined the youth-team at Wigan Athletic in June 2003. He made one appearance for the first-team, coming on as a substitute for Josip Skoko in extra-time of a 3–3 draw at Leeds United in an FA Cup Third Round replay on 17 January 2006. Manager Paul Jewell said that "he didn't let anybody down" in the game and praised his attitude in training, as did "Latics" youth-team coach David Lee. However Joyce did not make an appearance for the club in the Premier League and was allowed to leave the JJB Stadium at the end of the 2005–06 season.

Carlisle United
After a short trial, Joyce joined Carlisle United, initially with the club taking over his Wigan scholarship, signing on a permanent basis in July 2006. He made his debut in League One as an 85th-minute substitute for Simon Hackney in a 2–0 win over Cheltenham Town at Brunton Park on 3 September.
He scored his first senior goal for the "Cumbrians" in a 5–0 victory over Gillingham on 24 March. He was sent off for the first time in his career in a 2–0 defeat at Port Vale on 7 April. He made a total of 16 appearances across the 2006–07 season, helping Neil McDonald's "Blues" to an eighth-place finish. He featured just three times under new manager John Ward during the 2007–08 campaign, though managed to score his second career goal in a 3–2 win over Port Vale on 5 January.

On 27 November 2008, he joined Conference Premier club Barrow on a one-month loan; "Bluebirds" manager David Bayliss said that "Luke will definitely strengthen us but whether he starts or not remains to be seen". He made his debut at Holker Street in the shock FA Cup Second Round defeat of Brentford.
He remained with the club for five weeks, featuring seven times, before leaving after their FA Cup elimination by Middlesbrough in January 2009.
On 13 March 2009, he joined Northwich Victoria on an initial one-month loan. He scored on his debut for the "Vics" two days later in a 4–1 defeat at Cambridge United. He scored two goals in 12 games for Andy Preece's side, who ended the 2008–09 season being relegated out of the Conference Premier. Nevertheless, he said he enjoyed his time at the Victoria Stadium, and upon returning to Carlisle he found that he was to be released by manager Greg Abbott.

Accrington Stanley
On 25 June 2009, Joyce signed with League Two club Accrington Stanley. He made 50 appearances in the 2009–10 season, scoring one goal. He featured 32 times in the 2010–11 campaign, helping "Accy" to reach the League Two play-offs for the first time, before they were beaten by Stevenage at the semi-final stage. He scored three goals in 47 matches as Stanley finished in 14th-place under the stewardship of Paul Cook at the end of the 2011–12 season; Joyce took over as captain following the departure of Andrew Procter in January 2012. He made 48 appearances across the 2012–13 campaign, with Stanley ending up in 18th-place under new boss Leam Richardson. Joyce played 49 games in the 2013–14 season as Accrington posted a 15th-place finish under the stewardship of rookie manager James Beattie. When the club were bottom of the English Football League in November after failing to win in their first 12 league games, Joyce stood by Beattie, calling him a "good manager and a good bloke". Two months later Beattie returned the favour by calling Joyce an "unsung hero" after he scored his first goal in 22 months to help secure a 2–1 victory over Cheltenham Town. John Coleman returned as manager early in the 2014–15 campaign and kept Joyce as captain, with the midfielder scoring four goals from 50 appearances. Joyce said "it has been an up and down season... overall, I guess it has been a decent season, we have secured our tenth season in the Football League and that's a massive achievement for the club the size of ours, but we are disappointed we haven't finished further up the league".

Return to Carlisle United
On 21 May 2015, Joyce turned down a two-year contract with Accrington to rejoin former club Carlisle United on a two-year deal. He made 42 appearances as United posted a tenth-place finish in League Two at the end of the 2015–16 season, though was booed and criticised by some supporters after suffering from poor form in March, which manager Keith Curle blamed on a "nervous period". He helped Carlisle to record a 2–1 win at Queens Park Rangers in the League Cup, before he missed a penalty in Carlisle's penalty shootout defeat to Liverpool at Anfield in the Third Round. Joyce went on to miss just one of Carlisle's 56 games during the 2016–17 season, as the club secured a play-off place with a sixth-place finish before losing to Exeter City in the play-off semi-finals. In the Second Round of the EFL Cup he helped Carlisle to secure a 1–1 draw at Derby County, and then remarkably converted two penalties as Carlisle were beaten 14–13 following 11 rounds of sudden death in the resulting penalty shoot-out. On 29 October, he scored with a long-range strike in a 3–1 home win over Crawley Town, which ended up winning him that month Goal of the Month award for League Two. In April 2017, it was confirmed that Joyce would remain at the club after triggering a one-year extension to his contract. He scored two goals – adding a tap in at Newport County to his strike against Crawley – in 46 appearances during the 2017–18 as Carlisle went on to finish in tenth-position, before leaving the club after rejecting a new 12-month deal on reduced terms offered to him by the managerless club.

Port Vale
On 17 May 2018, Joyce signed a two-year contract with League Two side Port Vale; manager Neil Aspin said that "he is comfortable in possession and was impressive against us for Carlisle". He chose to join the "Valiants" despite receiving a better contract offer from a club playing below the English Football League. He started the 2018–19 season in a central midfield partnership with Manny Oyeleke. However he lost his place to Tom Conlon after Conlon returned to fitness in September, and Joyce went on to admit that "I have not quite performed as well as I would like to and had the influence on games". He continued in indifferent form for the rest of Aspin's tenure and was given permission to look for a new club in January after going seven games without a first-team appearance, though started against Lincoln City on New Year's Day and remained in the first-team thereafter. He became a key player under new manager John Askey in February and ended the season with 35 starts and seven substitute appearances.

On 18 September 2019, he marked his 500th appearance in a Football League fixture as Vale lost 2–0 at league leaders Exeter City; he quipped that "that probably sums up my career really, Exeter away on a Tuesday night". He scored his first goal for the club on 5 October, levelling the scores in what finished as a 3–1 win over Morecambe at Vale Park. In February 2020, it was announced that Joyce had triggered a clause in his contract to keep him at the club until summer 2021. He scored one goal in 43 appearances throughout the 2019–20 season, missing just one league game due to suspension, providing the defensive cover in the holding midfield role to allow players such as Scott Burgess, Jake Taylor and Tom Conlon to get further forward. He was a joint winner of that season's Players' Player of the Year award, along with David Worrall.

On 14 November 2020, Joyce was sent off for a high tackle when Vale were leading Tranmere Rovers 2–0, and the team went on to lose 4–3 in his absence. The team also lost the three games he missed due to suspension. The losing run continued following his return to the team, leading Joyce to say that "losing games hurts... but we just have to deal with". Joyce featured 46 times in the 2020–21 season, but was one of 15 players released by new manager Darrell Clarke in May 2021. Joyce said that he was disappointed not to be offered a new contract but that "I have taken great pride in playing for Port Vale".

AFC Fylde
On 28 June 2021, Joyce agreed a one-year deal with National League North club AFC Fylde; manager Jim Bentley stated that "this is a real big signing for the football club. Luke has proven to be one of the best midfielders in League Two over many seasons. His stats are phenomenal, he's an excellent professional and is very well respected within the game". In joining the "Coasters" he rejected the opportunity to stay in League Two with Oldham Athletic. He featured 34 times in the 2021–22 campaign as Fylde finished in third-place, but did not feature in their unsuccessful play-off campaign and was released in the summer by new manager James Rowe.

Radcliffe
On 20 June 2022, Joyce joined Northern Premier League Premier Division club Radcliffe, having previously been a teammate of manager Bobby Grant at Accrington.

Style of play
Joyce describes himself as a "working player in midfield" who wins the ball and passes it onto more creative teammates. Port Vale manager John Askey stated that "with Luke not only is it his football, his organisation and encouragement helps the other players". His successor, Darrell Clarke, classed Joyce as a deep-lying midfielder.

Coaching career
Joyce holds a UEFA B Licence and by 2019 had set up a junior academy in Westhoughton.

Career statistics

References

External links

1987 births
Living people
Footballers from Bolton
English footballers
Association football midfielders
Bolton Wanderers F.C. players
Wigan Athletic F.C. players
Carlisle United F.C. players
Barrow A.F.C. players
Northwich Victoria F.C. players
Accrington Stanley F.C. players
Port Vale F.C. players
AFC Fylde players
Radcliffe F.C. players
English Football League players
National League (English football) players
Northern Premier League players
Association football coaches